Frederik II Videregående skole is the name of an upper secondary school located in the Norwegian city of Fredrikstad. The school is named after the Danish-Norwegian king Frederik II(1534-1588). The school is, with more than 1,200 students, one of the largest schools of its kind in Norway.

References 

Education in Viken (county)
Secondary schools in Norway
Fredrikstad